The 1974 California Secretary of State election was held on November 5, 1974. Democratic nominee March Fong Eu defeated Republican nominee Brian Van Camp with 57.93% of the vote.

Primary elections
Primary elections were held on June 4, 1974.

Democratic primary

Candidates
March Fong Eu, State Assemblywoman 
Walter J. Karabian, State Assemblyman
Catherine O'Neill
Robert S. Jordan
Herman Sillas
Bruce Edward Brant

Results

Republican primary

Candidates
Brian Van Camp
Michael B. Montgomery
James L. Shinn
Wendell T. Handy
Willard C. "Bill" Fonda

Results

General election

Candidates
Major party candidates
March Fong Eu, Democratic
Brian Van Camp, Republican

Other candidates
Charles C. Ripley, American Independent
Kay McGlachlin, Peace and Freedom

Results

References

1974
Secretary of State
California